This page shows the standings and results for Group G of the UEFA Euro 2012 qualifying tournament.

Standings

Matches
A meeting was held in Zürich, Switzerland, on 15 March to determine the Group G fixture schedule. After that meeting proved inconclusive, the fixture list was determined by a random draw at the XXXIV Ordinary UEFA Congress in Tel Aviv, Israel, on 25 March 2010.

Goalscorers

Discipline

References 

Group G
2010–11 in English football
qual
2010–11 in Welsh football
2011–12 in Welsh football
2010–11 in Bulgarian football
2011–12 in Bulgarian football
2010–11 in Swiss football
2011–12 in Swiss football
2010–11 in Montenegrin football
2011–12 in Montenegrin football